PDTC may refer to: 

 Pyrrolidine dithiocarbamate
 2,6-Pyridinedicarbothioic acid